Emma Fitz-Osborn or Emma de Breteuil, and later Emma de Guader (died after 1096), was a Norman noblewoman, the wife of Ralph de Guader and the daughter of William FitzOsbern, Lord of Breteuil and later first Earl of Hereford of a new creation, who was a cousin and close adviser of William the Conqueror. William's opposition to their marriage led to the unsuccessful Revolt of the Earls.

Life
Emma was first named Emma de Breteuil, born to William Fitz-Osbern and his wife Adeliza, the daughter of Roger I of Tosny and his wife Adelaide (the daughter of Ermesinde of Carcassonne, regent-countess of Barcelona). She was born in or around 1059 in Breteuil in Normandy.

Marriage
At Exning in Cambridge, at 1075 she married Ralph de Gael the earl of East Anglia, after his father. King William I is believed to have opposed the match. Some writers believe that William's opposition was possibly due to the fact that uniting two huge estates, and royal lines posed a perceived threat to him, and William I had previously poisoned relatives that stood in his way of the throne.

Defence of Norwich Castle
At the "brides ale" or wedding feast, her brother and husband then planned a rebellion against William the Conqueror but were betrayed. Her brother was captured and then imprisoned for many years by William I but her husband escaped to Denmark to raise help. Others who had supported the rebellion were subjected to violence. Emma stayed to defend Norwich Castle which was besieged by William I. Despite the odds against her, and those at the castle, she bravely refused to give in to the king's men. She organised the defense of the town for so long that William eventually had to compromise with her to restore peace. Part of the settlement included a safe passage for herself and her troops in exchange for her castle. The Countess left for Brittany, where she was joined by her husband.

Life in Brittany
She went to live in Brittany with her husband, at their vast inherited estates, including the castles of Wader and Montfort. They had at least three children, and her son Raoul II inherited their estates.

Crusades
She was an active participant in the first Crusade, she joined the first Crusade in 1096 under Robert Curthose along with her husband and son, Alan. Emma died some time after 1096 on the road to Palestine during the First Crusade with her husband.

Emma's granddaughter, (daughter of Raoul II) Amice, married Robert de Beaumont, 2nd Earl of Leicester.

References

Bibliography

Norfolk, Emma de Guader, Countess of
Women in medieval European warfare
11th-century English people
Women in 11th-century warfare
Women in war in Britain
Christians of the First Crusade
Daughters of British earls
Year of birth unknown
Year of death unknown